Kevin Hays (born May 1, 1968) is an American jazz pianist and composer. He began playing in New York while still at high school and led his first record date in 1990. He has recorded more than twenty albums as leader or co-leader, including three each for SteepleChase and Blue Note Records. He led a long-standing trio with bassist Doug Weiss and drummer Bill Stewart, and has also sung with his New Day Trio of bassist Rob Jost and drummer Greg Joseph.

Early life
Hays was born in New York City on May 1, 1968, the youngest of four children. He was raised in Greenwich, Connecticut, and began studying the piano at the age of six, after hearing his father, an amateur player. He was initially interested in rock music and other things that he heard on the radio, and became more interested in jazz in his early teens. Initially self-taught, Hays later had lessons with Lou Stein, and attended several Interlochen Music Camps. Hays played locally from 1982.

Later life and career
Hays started playing in New York in 1985, while still at high school. He then had a period in Nick Brignola's band, and attended the Manhattan School of Music for a semester in 1986 before dropping out to concentrate on performing. His debut recording as a leader came in 1990, for the Japanese label Jazz City. Several of the tracks on this album, El Matador, were his own compositions. During 1991 to 1993, he also recorded three albums for SteepleChase Records.

"Hays played regularly with a number of Bob Belden's ensembles from the late 1980s, and in the 1990s he toured Japan and recorded with the Harper Brothers (1990) and worked with Steve Wilson, Benny Golson (from c. 1990), Joshua Redman's quartet (1992), Seamus Blake (from 1993), and Eddie Henderson (from 1994)." After the SteepleChase albums, he signed to Blue Note Records, who released three of his albums. In 1995 Hays toured with saxophonist Sonny Rollins.

Hays's trio, with Doug Weiss (bass) and Bill Stewart (drums), played together for 15 years. Hays also recorded albums under Stewart's leadership in the 2000s. In 2010–11, Hays performed and recorded duets with pianist Brad Mehldau. Also in 2011, Variations, a solo piano album that included interpretations of Robert Schumann, was released by Pirouet Records. Hays formed the New Day Trio, with Rob Jost on bass and Greg Joseph on drums, and also sang on their first release, New Day. This was followed around a year later by North. Hope, a duo album with Lionel Loueke, was released around 2017.

Playing style
"Hays has a linear style and a strong harmonic sense, and uses the pedal to produce a clipped sound, recalling the early work of Paul Bley."

Discography

As leader/co-leader

As sideman 

With Bob Belden
 Straight to My Heart: The Music of Sting (Blue Note, 1991)
 Puccini's Turandot (Blue Note, 1993)
 When the Doves Cry: The Music of Prince (Blue Note, 1994)
 Shades of Blue (Blue Note, 1996)
 Strawberry Fields (Blue Note, 1996)
 Tapestry (Blue Note, 1997)
 Black Dahlia (Blue Note, 2001)
 Three Days of Rain (Sunnyside, 2006)

With Steve Gadd
 2017: Steve Gadd Band (Victor, 2018)
 2019: At Blue Note Tokyo (Victor, 2021) – live

With Benny Golson
 1991: Domingo (Dreyfus, 1992)
 1996: Up Jumped Benny (Arkadia Jazz, 1997) – live

With Eddie Henderson
 Inspiration (Milestone, 1995) – recorded in 1994
 Dark Shadows (Milestone, 1996)
 Dreams of Gershwin (Key Stone, 1998)
 Reemergence (Sharp Nine, 1999)
 Oasis (Sirocco, 2001)
 Precious Moment (Kind of Blue, 2006)

With Chris Potter
 1992: Presenting Chris Potter (Criss Cross Jazz, 1993)
 1993: Sundiata (Criss Cross Jazz, 1995) 
 2000: This Will Be (Storyville, 2001) – live
 2000: Gratitude (Verve, 2001)
 2002: Traveling Mercies (Verve, 2002)
 2002: Lift: Live at the Village Vanguard (Sunnyside, 2004)

With others
 Jeff Ballard, Fairgrounds (Edition, 2018)
 Ricardo Grilli, 1962 (Tone Rogue)
 Vincent Herring, Dawnbird (Landmark, 1993) – recorded in 1991–92
 Joshua Redman, Joshua Redman (Warner Bros, 1993)
 Mark Turner and Tad Shull, Two Tenor Ballads (Criss Cross Jazz, 2000) – recorded in 1994

References

External links
Homepage
Interview with Pablo Held

1968 births
Living people
American jazz pianists
American male pianists
Manhattan School of Music alumni
Musicians from Greenwich, Connecticut
Musicians from New York City
ACT Music artists
Blue Note Records artists
Edition Records artists
Sunnyside Records artists
SteepleChase Records artists
20th-century American pianists
Jazz musicians from New York (state)
Jazz musicians from Connecticut
21st-century American pianists
20th-century American male musicians
21st-century American male musicians
American male jazz musicians
Pirouet Records artists